2C-T-21 (4-(2-fluoroethylthio)-2,5-dimethoxyphenethylamine) is a psychedelic phenethylamine of the 2C family sometimes used as an entheogen.  It was first synthesized by Alexander Shulgin.

Dosage

In his book PiHKAL (Phenethylamines i Have Known And Loved), Shulgin lists the dosage range as 8–12 mg.

Effects

2C-T-21 is generally taken orally and effects typically last 7 to 10 hours.  The potential psychotherapeutic applications of this chemical were explored by Myron Stolaroff.

Pharmacology

The mechanism that produces 2C-T-21's hallucinogenic and entheogenic effects has not been established; however, it may result from action as a 5-HT2A serotonin receptor agonist in the brain, a mechanism of action shared by all of the hallucinogenic tryptamines and phenethylamines for which the mechanism of action is known.

Dangers

On March 9, 2004, a 22-year-old quadriplegic man named James Edwards Downs in St. Francisville, Louisiana, consumed an unknown dose of 2C-T-21 by sticking his tongue into a vial of powder he had purchased online. Four days later, on March 13, Downs died at Lane Memorial Hospital in Zachary, LA.

This death became part of a two-year DEA investigation called Operation Web Tryp which was launched in 2002. On July 22, 2004, the owners of American Chemical Supply were arrested on federal charges relating to distribution of controlled substance analogues and the death of James Edwards Downs. Little is known about the toxicity of 2C-T-21 beyond this incident.

Legality

2C-T-21 is unscheduled and uncontrolled in the United States, but possession and sales of 2C-T-21 would probably be prosecuted under the Federal Analog Act because of its structural similarities to 2C-T-7 and its known potential to cause death. In the wake of Operation Web Tryp in July 2004, at least one distributor faced charges as a consequence of the death of James Downs from 2C-T-21 overdose.

Canada
As of October 31, 2016, 2C-T-21 is a controlled substance (Schedule III) in Canada.

References

External links
 Erowid 2C-T-21 Vault

2C (psychedelics)
Thioethers
Fluoroethyl compounds
Designer drugs